Kishni  Assembly constituency is  one of the 403 constituencies of the Uttar Pradesh Legislative Assembly,  India. It is a part of the Mainpuri district and  one of the five assembly constituencies in the Mainpuri Lok Sabha constituency. First election in this assembly constituency was held in 1962 after the "DPACO (1961)" (delimitation order) was passed in 1961. After the "Delimitation of Parliamentary and Assembly Constituencies Order" was passed in 2008, the constituency was assigned identification number 109.

Wards  / Areas
Extent  of Kishni Assembly constituency is KC Elau, Kishni, Kusmara of Bhongaon  Tehsil; Kusmara NP, Kishni NP of Mainpuri Tehsil & KC Kurra of Karhal  Tehsil.

Members of the Legislative Assembly

Election results

2022

2012
16th Vidhan Sabha: 2012 General  Elections

See also
Mainpuri district
Mainpuri Lok Sabha constituency
Sixteenth Legislative Assembly of Uttar Pradesh
Uttar Pradesh Legislative Assembly
Vidhan Bhawan

References

External links
 

Assembly constituencies of Uttar Pradesh
Mainpuri district
Constituencies established in 1961